William Gregson may refer to:

 William Gregson (slave trader) (1721–1800), English slave trader and Lord Mayor of Liverpool
 William Gregson (barrister) (1790–1863), English barrister and Home Office under-secretary
 William Gregson (cricketer) (1877–1963), Scottish cricketer